West Stirlingshire was a county constituency of the House of Commons of the Parliament of the United Kingdom, to which it elected one Member of Parliament (MP) by the first past the post electoral system.

The constituency was created for the 1918 general election, as one of two divisions of the Parliamentary County of Stirling and Clackmannan. It was then defined as the Central and Western County Districts of the County of Stirling including all burghs within their boundaries, save for the Burgh of Stirling. From 1950 onwards, due to local government changes, it was defined as the Burghs of Bridge of Allan, Denny and Dunipace and the Central No. 1, Central No. 2, Western No. 1, Western No. 2 and Western No. 3 Districts of the County of Stirling.

The constituency was abolished for the 1983 general election.

Members of Parliament

Elections

Elections in the 1910s

Elections in the 1920s

The Liberal nomination, William Wright, died the day after being nominated, so his name did not appear on the ballot.

Elections in the 1930s

General Election 1939–40

Another General Election was required to take place before the end of 1940. The political parties had been making preparations for an election to take place and by the Autumn of 1939, the following candidates had been selected; 
Labour: Alfred Balfour
Conservative:

Elections in the 1940s

Elections in the 1950s

Elections in the 1960s

Elections in the 1970s

References

Sources 
 
 http://www.politicsresources.net

See also 

Historic parliamentary constituencies in Scotland (Westminster)
Constituencies of the Parliament of the United Kingdom established in 1918
Constituencies of the Parliament of the United Kingdom disestablished in 1983
Stirlingshire